A first-order fluid is another name for a power-law fluid with exponential dependence of viscosity on temperature.

where γ̇ is the shear rate, T is temperature and μ0, n and b are coefficients.

The model can be re-written as

Non-Newtonian fluids